

Events

January 

 January 14 – 1907 Kingston earthquake: A 6.5 Mw earthquake in Kingston, Jamaica, kills between 800 and 1,000.

February 
 February 7 – The "Mud March", the first large procession organized by the National Union of Women's Suffrage Societies (NUWSS), takes place in London. 
 February 11 – The French warship Jean Bart sinks off the coast of Morocco.
 February 12 – The steamship Larchmont collides with the Harry Hamilton in Long Island Sound; 183 lives are lost.
 February 16 – SKF, a worldwide mechanical parts manufacturing brand (mainly, bearing and seal), is founded in Gothenburg, Sweden.
 February 21 – The English mail steamship Berlin is wrecked off the Hook of Holland; 142 lives are lost. 
 February 24 – The Austrian Lloyd steamship Imperatrix, from Trieste to Bombay, is wrecked on Cape of Crete and sinks; 137 lives are lost.

March
 March
 The steamship Congo collides at the mouth of the Ems River with the German steamship Nerissa; 7 lives are lost. 
 The 1907 Romanian Peasants' Revolt results in possibly as many as 11,000 deaths.
 The Diamond Sūtra, a woodblock printed Buddhist scripture dated 868, is discovered by Aurel Stein in the Mogao Caves in China; it is "the earliest complete survival of a dated printed book".
 Pablo Picasso completes his painting Les Demoiselles d'Avignon.
 March 5 – At the opening of the new State Duma in Saint Petersburg, Russia, 40,000 demonstrators are dispersed by Russian troops.
 March 11 – The Prime Minister of Bulgaria, Dimitar Petkov, is assassinated by an anarchist in Sofia.
 March 15–16 – Elections to the new Parliament of Finland are the first in the world for a national assembly with woman candidates, as well as the first elections in Europe where universal suffrage is applied; 19 women are elected.
 March 22 – The first taxicabs with taximeters begin operating in London.
 March 25 – The first university sports federation in Europe is established in Hungary, with the participation or support of the associations of ten universities and colleges.
 c. March 28 – The volcano Ksudach erupts, in the Kamchatka Peninsula.

April 
 April 7 – Hershey Park opens in Hershey, Pennsylvania.
 April 17
 The first Minas Geraes-class battleship is laid down for Brazil, by Armstrong Whitworth on the River Tyne, in England, triggering the South American dreadnought race.
 Today is the all-time busiest day of immigration to the United States through Ellis Island; this will be the busiest year ever seen here, with 1.1 million immigrants arriving.
 April 24 – Al Ahly SC is founded in Cairo by Omar Lotfi, as a gathering place for Egyptian students' unions in the struggle against colonization; it is the first association football club officially founded in Egypt or Africa.

May 
 May 13 – The 5th Congress of the Russian Social Democratic Labour Party convenes in secret in London.

June 
 June 5 – Shastri Yagnapurushdas consecrates the murtis of both Sahajanand Swami and Gunatitanand Swami in a single central shrine, thus establishing the Bochasanwasi Shri Akshar Purushottam Swaminarayan Sanstha, later a United Nations affiliate organization.
 June 10–August 10 – The Peking to Paris motor race is won by Prince Scipione Borghese, driving a 7-litre 35/45 hp Itala.
 June 15 – The Second Hague Peace Conference opens at The Hague.
 June 22 – The London Underground's Charing Cross, Euston and Hampstead Railway opens.
 June 26 – Tiflis bank robbery: Bolsheviks attack a cash-filled bank coach in the centre of Tiflis, Georgia, killing 40 people.

July 
 July 1 – The Orange River Colony gains autonomy, as the Orange Free State.
 July 6 – Guardians of the Irish Crown Jewels notice that they have been stolen.
 July 15 – The London Electrobus Company started running the first ever service of battery-electric buses between London's Victoria Station and Liverpool Street.
 July 21 – The  sinks after colliding with the lumber schooner San Pedro, off Shelter Cove, California, resulting in 88 deaths.
 July 24 – The Japan–Korea Treaty of 1907 brings the government and military of the protectorate of Korea more firmly under Japanese control.

August 
 August 24–31 – The International Anarchist Congress of Amsterdam meets in the Netherlands.
 August 28 – UPS is founded by James E. (Jim) Casey in Seattle, Washington.
 August 29 – The partially completed superstructure of the Quebec Bridge collapses entirely, claiming the lives of 76 workers.
 August 31 – Count Alexander Izvolsky and Sir Arthur Nicolson sign the Anglo-Russian Entente in Saint Petersburg, bringing a pause in The Great Game in Central Asia, and establishing the Triple Entente.

September 
 September 7 – British passenger liner  sets out on her maiden voyage, from Liverpool (England) to New York City.
 September 26 – New Zealand and Newfoundland become dominions.

October 
 October – A committee of the Delegation for the Adoption of an International Auxiliary Language, made up of academics including Otto Jespersen, Wilhelm Ostwald and Roland Eötvös, meet in Paris to select a language for international use. The committee ultimately decides to reform Esperanto.
 October 8 – Edvard Grieg's Olaf Trygvason, his only opera, is produced posthumously in Christiania, Norway.
 October 17 – Guglielmo Marconi initiates commercial transatlantic radio communications between his high power longwave wireless telegraphy stations in Clifden, Ireland, and Glace Bay, Nova Scotia.
 October 18 – The Hague Convention is revised by the (second) Hague Peace Conference (effective 26 January 1910).
 October 24 – A major United States financial crisis is averted when J. P. Morgan, E. H. Harriman, James Stillman, Henry Clay Frick and other Wall Street financiers create a $25,000,000 pool to invest in the shares on the plunging New York Stock Exchange, ending the bank panic of 1907.
 October 27 – Černová massacre: Fifteen people are shot during the consecration of a Catholic church in Hungary (modern-day Slovakia).
 October 31 – The Parliament of Finland approves the Prohibition Act, but the law was not implemented because it was not ratified by Tsar Nicholas II of Russia.

November 

 November 4 – Russian immigrant bakers Perry and Ben Feigenson begin transforming their cake frosting flavors into The Feigenson Brothers Bottling Works soft drink recipe, later shortened to Faygo.
 November 16
 British passenger liner RMS Mauretania, the world's largest and fastest at this date, sets out on her maiden voyage from Liverpool to New York.
 President Theodore Roosevelt proclaims that Oklahoma has become the 46th state in the United States.
 November 21 – Washington State College defeats the University of Washington 10-5 in the Apple Cup in college football, played in Seattle.
 November 25
 The Church of God in Christ, which becomes the fifth-largest African-American Pentecostal-Holiness Christian denomination in the United States, is founded by Bishop Charles Harrison Mason in Memphis, Tennessee.
 Edeka, a major retailer group in Europe, was founded in Germany.

December 
 December 6 – Monongah Mining disaster: A coal mine explosion kills 362 workers in Monongah, West Virginia.
 December 8 – Upon the death of Oscar II, he is succeeded by his son Gustaf V, as king of Sweden.
 December 14 – The largest sailing ship ever built, the 7-masted Thomas W. Lawson, is wrecked in the Isles of Scilly.
 December 16 – The American Great White Fleet begins its circumnavigation of the world.
 December 17 – Ugyen Wangchuck becomes the first Druk Gyalpo (king of Bhutan).
 December 19 – An explosion in a coal mine in Jacobs Creek, Pennsylvania kills 239.
 December 21 – Santa María School massacre: In Chile, soldiers fire at striking mineworkers gathered in the Santa María School in Iquique; over 2,000 are killed.
 December 31 – The first ever "ball drop" is held in Times Square, in New York City.

Date unknown 
 Anino ng Kahapon, a Tagalog-language novel is published.
 The triode thermionic amplifier invented by Lee de Forest, starting the development of electronics as a practical technology.
 The Autochrome Lumière is the first commercial color photography process.
 Indiana, in the United States, becomes the world's first legislature to place laws permitting compulsory sterilization for eugenic purposes on the statute book.
 The Moine Thrust Belt in Scotland is identified, one of the first to be discovered anywhere.
 The Landsforbundet for Kvinders Valgret is founded. 
 James Murray Spangler invents the first Hoover vacuum cleaner.
 Henri Matisse begins to teach at the Académie Matisse in Paris, a private and non-commercial art school.
 Statue J.E.B. Stuart, Confederate general, is dedicated on Richmond, Virginia's Monument Avenue.

Births

January 

 January 1 – Aftab Ali, Bengali politician, social reformer (d. 1972)
 January 3 – Ray Milland, Welsh actor, film director (d. 1986)
 January 5 – Volmari Iso-Hollo, Finnish athlete (d. 1969)
 January 8 – Keizō Hayashi, Japanese civil servant, military official (d. 1991)
 January 11 – Pierre Mendès France, French politician, 142nd Prime Minister of France (d. 1982)
 January 12 – Sergei Korolev, Russian rocket scientist (d. 1966)
 January 16 – Alexander Knox, Canadian actor, novelist (d. 1995)
 January 17 – Henk Badings, Dutch composer (d. 1987)
 January 18 – Lina Haag, German World War II resistance fighter (d. 2012)
 January 20
 Manfred von Ardenne, German research and applied physicist, inventor (d. 1997)
 Paula Wessely, Austrian actress (d. 2000)
 January 22 – Dixie Dean, English football player (d. 1980)
 January 23 – Hideki Yukawa, Japanese physicist, Nobel Prize laureate (d. 1981)
 January 24
 Maurice Couve de Murville, Prime Minister of France (d. 1999)
 Sultan Ismail Nasiruddin Shah, King of Malaysia (d. 1979)
 January 27 – Joyce Compton, American actress (d. 1997)
 January 29 – Bil Dwyer, American cartoonist and humorist (d. 1987)

February 

 February 1 – Günter Eich, German writer (d. 1972)
 February 5
 Birgit Dalland, Norwegian politician (d. 2007)
 Pierre Pflimlin, French politician (d. 2000)
 Sergio Méndez Arceo, Roman Catholic bishop of Cuernavaca, Mexico 1953-1983 (d. 1992)
 February 6 – Russell Gleason, American actor (d. 1945)
 February 9 
 Pierre Aliker, French-Martinican politician (d. 2013)
 Trường Chinh, President of Vietnam (d. 1988)
 February 12 – Clifton C. Edom, American photojournalism educator (d. 1991)
 February 15
 Jean Langlais, French composer, organist (d. 1991)
 Cesar Romero, American actor (d. 1994)
 February 18 – Oscar Brodney, American screenwriter (d. 2008)
 February 21 – W. H. Auden, English poet (d. 1973)
 February 22
 Sheldon Leonard, American actor, writer, director, and producer (d. 1997)
 Robert Young, American actor (d. 1998)
 February 25 – Kathryn Wasserman Davis, American philanthropist (d. 2013)
 February 26
 Dub Taylor, American actor (d. 1994)
 Rosebud Yellow Robe, Native American folklorist, educator, and author (d. 1992)
 February 27 – Mildred Bailey, American singer (d. 1951)
 February 28 – Milton Caniff, American cartoonist (d. 1988)

March 

 March 4 – Maria Branyas Morera, Spanish supercentenarian, oldest living person
 March 8 – Konstantinos Karamanlis, Greek politician (d. 1998)
 March 9 – Mircea Eliade, Romanian religious historian, writer (d. 1986)
 March 12
 Arthur Hewlett, British actor (d. 1997)
 Dorrit Hoffleit, American astronomer (d. 2007)
 March 15 – Zarah Leander, Swedish actress, singer (d. 1981)
 March 16
 Frances Fuller, American actress (d. 1980)
 Hans Kleppen, Norwegian ski jumper (d. 2009)
 March 17
 Takeo Miki, 41st Prime Minister of Japan (d. 1988)
 Jean Van Houtte, 38th Prime Minister of Belgium (d. 1991)
 March 18 – John Zachary Young, English biologist (d. 1997)
 March 23 – Daniel Bovet, Swiss-born scientist, Nobel Prize laureate (d. 1992)
 March 27 – Mary Treen, American actress (d. 1989)
 March 28 – Lúcia Santos, Portuguese nun, visionary (d. 2005)
 March 29 – Braguinha, Brazilian songwriter (d. 2006)
 March 30 – Friedrich August Freiherr von der Heydte, German Luftwaffe officer (d. 1994)

April 

 April 1 – Shivakumara Swami, Hindu religious figure and humanitarian (d. 2019)
 April 10
 Marcel Deviq, French Algerian engineer, businessman, and politician (d. 1972)
 Germán Suárez Flamerich, Venezuelan lawyer, politician and 50th President of Venezuela (d. 1990)
 April 11 
 Paul Douglas, American actor (d. 1959)
 April 12 – Felix de Weldon, Austrian-born sculptor (d. 2003)
 April 13 – Harold Stassen, American politician (d. 2001)
 April 14 – François Duvalier, 32nd President of Haiti (d. 1971)
 April 15 – Nikolaas Tinbergen, Dutch ornithologist, Nobel Prize laureate (d. 1988)
 April 16 – Joseph-Armand Bombardier, Canadian inventor, founder of Bombardier Inc. (d. 1964) 
 April 21 – Wade Mainer, American singer, banjoist (d. 2011)
 April 23
 James Hayter, British actor (d. 1983)
 Fritz Wotruba, Austrian sculptor (d. 1975)
 April 24 – William Sargant, British psychiatrist (d. 1988)
 April 26 – Ilias Tsirimokos, Prime Minister of Greece (d. 1968)
 April 29
 Tino Rossi, French singer (d. 1983)
 Fred Zinnemann, Austrian director (d. 1997)

May 

 May 1 – Oliver Hill, American lawyer (d. 2007)
 May 2 – Pinky Lee, American comedian (d. 1993)
 May 3 – Dorothy Young, American entertainer (d. 2011)
 May 4 – Walter Walsh, American FBI agent, Olympic shooter, and USMC instructor (d. 2014)
 May 5 – Iryna Vilde, Ukrainian writer (d. 1982)
 May 9 – Baldur von Schirach, Nazi official (d. 1974)
 May 11 – Kent Taylor, American actor (d. 1987)
 May 12 – Katharine Hepburn, American actress (d. 2003)
 May 13 – Dame Daphne du Maurier, English author (d. 1989)
 May 14
 Ayub Khan, President of Pakistan (d. 1974)
 Johnny Moss, American poker player (d. 1995)
 Bob Tisdall, Irish Olympic athlete (d. 2004)
 May 22
 Hergé, Belgian cartoonist (d. 1983)
 Laurence Olivier, English stage, screen actor and director (d. 1989)
 May 25 – U Nu, Burmese politician (d. 1995)
 May 26 – John Wayne, American actor, film director (d. 1979)
 May 27
 Rachel Carson, American environmental writer (d. 1964)
 Carl Falck, Norwegian businessman (d. 2016)
 May 30
 Elly Beinhorn, German pilot (d. 2007)
 Germaine Tillion, French anthropologist, member of French Resistance (d. 2008)

June 

 June 1 – Frank Whittle, British jet engine developer (d. 1996)
 June 4
 Rosalind Russell, American actress (d. 1976)
 Jacques Roumain, Haitian writer, politician, and advocate of Marxism (d. 1944)
 June 5 – Rudolf Peierls, German-British physicist (d. 1995)
 June 7 – Arthur Marshall Davis, American judge (d. 1963)
 June 14 – René Char, French poet (d. 1988)
 June 16 – Jack Albertson, American actor, comedian (d. 1981)
 June 19
 Clarence Wiseman, Salvation Army general (d. 1985)
 George de Mestral, Swiss inventor (d. 1990)
 June 22 – Wesley E. Brown, American district court judge (d. 2012)
 June 23 – James Meade, English economist, Nobel Prize laureate (d. 1995)
 June 24 – Jean Schlumberger, French jewelry designer (d. 1987)
 June 25 
 Franca Dominici, Italian actress, voice actress (d. 1999)
 J. Hans D. Jensen, German physicist, Nobel Prize laureate (d. 1973)
 June 26 – Joan Harrison, English screenwriter, producer (d. 1994)
 June 27 – John McIntire, American actor (d. 1991)
 June 28
 Junius Driggs, American businessman (d. 1994) 
 Franciszka Themerson, Polish-born British artist, filmmaker (d. 1989)
 June 29 – Junji Nishikawa, Japanese football player (d. ?)

July 

 July 3
 Horia Sima, Romanian fascist politician (d. 1993)
 Nora Thompson Dean, Indigenous American (Lenape) linguist (d. 1984)
 July 4
 Henning Holck-Larsen, Danish engineer and businessman (d. 2003)
 Emilio Ochoa, Cuban dentist, politician (d. 2007)
 July 6 
 Frida Kahlo, Mexican painter (d. 1954)
 George Stanley, Canadian historian, author, soldier, teacher, public servant, and designer (d. 2002)
 July 7
 Walter Dieminger, German space scientist (d. 2000)
 Robert A. Heinlein, American science fiction author (d. 1988)
 Pavel Sudoplatov, Russian Lieutenant General (d. 1996)
 Prince Vasili Alexandrovich of Russia (d. 1989)
 July 9 
 Teresa Jungman, English socialite (d. 2010)
 Philip Klutznick, American administrator (d. 1999)
 July 10
 John Michaels, American pitcher (d. 1996)
 Lê Duẩn, Vietnamese politician (d. 1986)
 July 13 – George Weller, American novelist, playwright, and journalist (d. 2002)
 July 14 
 Annabella, French actress (d. 1996)
 Maria Matray, German screenwriter and actress (d. 1993)
 July 15 
 Paterson Fraser, English Royal Air Force (d. 2001)
 Shōshin Nagamine, Japanese author and soldier, police officer, and karate master (d. 1997)
 Mona Rico, Mexican-born American actress (d. 1994)
 July 16 – Barbara Stanwyck, American actress (d. 1990)
 July 19
 Giulio Balestrini, Italian football player (d. ?)
 Isabel Jewell, American actress (d. 1972)
 Paul Magloire, President of Haiti (d. 2001)
 July 21 
 A. D. Hope, Australian poet and essayist (d. 2000)
 Georg Rydeberg, Swedish actor (d. 1983)
 July 22 
 Jack Dennington, Australian rules footballer (d. 1994)
 Aldo Donelli, American football player and coach, soccer player, and college athletics administrator (d. 1994)
 Zubir Said, Singaporean composer of Singapore's national anthem (d. 1987)
 July 25 – Johnny Hodges, American alto saxophonist (d. 1970)
 July 27
 Ross Alexander, American actor (d. 1937)
 Richard Beesly, British Olympic gold medal rower (d. 1965)
 July 29 – Melvin Belli, American lawyer (d. 1996)

August 

 August 1 – Elisabeth Johansen, Greenlandic midwife and politician (d. 1993)
 August 2 – Mary Hamman, American writer and editor (d. 1984)
 August 3
 Ernesto Geisel, 29th President of Brazil (d. 1996)
 Yang Shangkun, 4th President of the People's Republic of China (d. 1998)
 Irene Tedrow, American actress (d. 1995)
 August 7
Bernard Brodie, English-American chemist and "founder of modern pharmacology" (d. 1989)
Albert Kotin, American painter (d. 1980)
 August 8 – Benny Carter, American musician (d. 2003)
 August 12
 Joe Besser, American comedian (d. 1988)
 Benjamin Sheares, 2nd President of Singapore (d. 1981)
 August 13 – Viscount William Waldorf Astor, British politician (d. 1966)
 August 14 – Stanley Adams, American lyricist and songwriter (d. 1994)
 August 15 – Bob Pearson, British variety performer with his brother Alf as half of Bob and Alf Pearson (d. 1985)
 August 20 – Alan Reed, American actor and voice actor (d. 1977)
 August 21
 John G. Trump, American electrical engineer, inventor, and physicist (d. 1985)
 Hy Zaret, American lyricist and composer (d. 2007)
 August 24
Bruno Giacometti, Swiss architect (d. 2012)
Gil Perkins, Australian actor and stuntman (d. 1999)
 August 28 – Rupert Hart-Davis, British publisher (d. 1999)
 August 29 – Lurene Tuttle, American character actress (d. 1986)
 August 31
 Argentina Brunetti, Argentinian actress and writer (d. 2005)
 Augustus F. Hawkins, American politician and civil rights lawmaker (d. 2007)
 Ramon Magsaysay, 7th President of the Philippines (d. 1957)

September 

 September 2
 Evelyn Hooker, American psychologist (d. 1996)
 Miriam Seegar, American actress (d. 2011)
 September 3 – Loren Eiseley, American author (d. 1977)
 September 4 
 Frances Griffiths, Cottingley Fairies girl (d. 1986)
 Reggie Nalder, Austrian actor (d. 1991)
 September 12
 Spud Chandler, American baseball player (d. 1990)
 Louis MacNeice, Northern Irish poet (d. 1963)
 September 15
 Jimmy Wallington, American radio personality (d. 1972)
 Fay Wray, Canadian-born actress (d. 2004)
 September 17 – Warren E. Burger, 15th Chief Justice of the United States (d. 1995)
 September 18
 Leon Askin, Austrian actor (d. 2005)
 Elza Brandeisz, Hungarian dancer, teacher (d. 2018)
 Edwin McMillan, American chemist, Nobel Prize laureate (d. 1991)
 September 19 – Lewis F. Powell Jr., Associate Justice of the Supreme Court of the United States (d. 1998)
 September 22 – Maurice Blanchot, French philosopher, writer (d. 2003)
 September 23
Anne Desclos, French journalist and author (d. 1998)
Duarte Nuno, Duke of Braganza, pretender to the throne of Portugal (d. 1976)
 September 26
 Anthony Blunt, British art historian, spy (d. 1983)
 Bep van Klaveren, Dutch boxer (d. 1992)
 September 27 – Zhang Chongren, Chinese artist (d. 1998)
 September 28 – Heikki Savolainen, Finnish artistic gymnast (d. 1997)
 September 29
 Gene Autry, American actor, singer, and businessman (d. 1998)
 George W. Jenkins, American businessman (d. 1996)

October 

 October 1 – Ödön Pártos, Hungarian-Israeli violist, composer (d. 1977)
 October 2
 Alexander R. Todd, Scottish chemist, Nobel Prize laureate (d. 1997)
 Víctor Paz Estenssoro , 45th President of Bolivia (d. 2001)
 October 5 – Elva Ruby Miller, American singer (d. 1997)
 October 6 – Francisco Gabilondo Soler, Mexican singer, composer (d. 1990)
 October 9 – Lord Hailsham, British politician (d. 2001)
 October 15 – Varian Fry, American journalist, rescuer (d. 1967)
 October 17 – John Marley, American actor (d. 1984)
 October 19 – Roger Wolfe Kahn, American bandleader (d. 1962)
 October 20 – Arlene Francis, Amcerican actress (d. 2001)
 October 24 – Rafael Godoy, Colombian composer (d. 1973)
 October 28 
 John Hewitt, Irish poet (d. 1987)
 Sergio Méndez Arceo, 7th Mexican bishop of Cuernavaca 1953–1982, and advocate of Liberation theology (d. 1991).
 October 30 – Sol Tax, American anthropologist (d. 1995)

November 

 November 1 – Homero Manzi, Argentine tango lyricist, author (d. 1951)
 November 6 – Charles W. Yost, American ambassador (d. 1981)
 November 7 – Dumitru Coliu, Romanian communist activist and politician (d. 1979)
 November 9 – Louis Ferdinand, Prince of Prussia (d. 1994)
 November 10 
John Moore, British author (d. 1967)
Salme Reek, Estonian actress (d. 1996)
 November 11
 Viktoria Brezhneva, First Lady of the Soviet Union (d. 1995)
 Günter Fronius, Transylvanian Saxon entrepreneur (d. 2015)
 November 14
 Howard W. Hunter, 14th president of the Church of Jesus Christ of Latter-day Saints (d. 1995)
 Astrid Lindgren, Swedish children's writer (d. 2002)
 William Steig, American cartoonist (d. 2003)
 November 15 – Claus Schenk Graf von Stauffenberg, German aristocrat, military officer (d. 1944)
 November 16 – Burgess Meredith, American actor, director (d. 1997)
 November 18
 Compay Segundo, Cuban musician (d. 2003)
 Gustav Nezval, Czech actor (d. 1998)
 November 19
 Luigi Beccali, Italian Olympic athlete (d. 1990)
 Hans Liska, Austrian-German artist (d. 1983)
 November 23 – Run Run Shaw, Hong Kong media mogul (d. 2014)
 November 26 – Ruth Patrick, American botanist (d. 2013)
 November 27 – L. Sprague de Camp, American writer (d. 2000)
 November 28 – Alberto Moravia, Italian novelist (d. 1990)
 November 28 – Katharine Bartlett, American physical anthropologist, museum curator (d. 2001)
 November 30 – Jacques Barzun, French-born American historian (d. 2012)

December 

 December 1 – Joey Aiuppa, American mobster (d. 1997)
 December 5 – Lin Biao, Chinese communist military leader (d. 1971)
 December 6 – Helli Stehle, Swiss actress, radio presenter (d. 2017)
 December 10 – Lucien Laurent, French footballer (d. 2005)
 December 12 – Roy Douglas, British composer (d. 2015)
 December 14 – Beatriz Costa, Portuguese actress (d. 1996)
 December 15 – Oscar Niemeyer, Brazilian architect (d. 2012)
 December 16 – Barbara Kent, Canadian silent film actress (d. 2011)
 December 19 – Jimmy McLarnin, Irish-born boxer (d. 2004)
 December 22 – Peggy Ashcroft, British actress (d. 1991)
 December 23 – James Roosevelt, American businessman, politician (d. 1991)
 December 25 
 Cab Calloway, American jazz singer and bandleader (d. 1994)
 Glenn McCarthy, American oil tycoon, businessman (d. 1988)
 December 27 – Johann Wilhelm Trollmann, German boxer (d. 1943)

Deaths

January 

 January 3 – Mozaffar ad-Din Shah Qajar, Shah of Iran (b. 1853)
 January 13 – Jakob Hurt, Estonian folklorist, theologian, and linguist (b. 1839)
 January 14 – Hermann Iseke, German doctor (b. 1856)
 January 19 – Giuseppe Saracco, 15th Prime Minister of Italy (b. 1821)
 January 21 – Graziadio Isaia Ascoli, Italian linguist (b. 1829)
 January 31 – Timothy Eaton, Canadian department store founder (b. 1834)

February 
 February 2 – Dmitri Mendeleev, Russian chemist (b. 1834)
 February 7 – Preston Leslie, 26th Governor of Kentucky and 9th territorial Governor of Montana (b. 1819)
 February 12 – Muriel Robb, English tennis player (b. 1878)
 February 13 – Marcel Alexandre Bertrand, French geologist (b. 1847)
 February 16
 Giosuè Carducci, Italian writer, Nobel Prize laureate (b. 1835)
 Clémentine of Orléans, daughter of King Louis-Philippe of France (b. 1817)
 February 17 – Henry Steel Olcott, American officer, theosophist (b. 1832)
 February 20 – Henri Moissan, French chemist, Nobel Prize laureate (b. 1852)
 February 21 – Erik Gustaf Boström, 7th Prime Minister of Sweden (b. 1842)
 February 26 – C. W. Alcock, English footballer, journalist, and football promoter (b. 1842)

March 
 March 3 – Oronhyatekha, Canadian Mohawk physician, CEO of an international benefit society, native statesman, scholar, rights campaigner and international shooter (b. 1841)
 March 7 – Charlotta Raa-Winterhjelm, Swedish actress (b. 1838)
 March 9 – Frederic George Stephens, English art critic (b. 1828)
 March 10 – George Douglas-Pennant, 2nd Baron Penrhyn, Welsh industrialist (b. 1836)
 March 11 
 Jean Casimir-Perier, 6th President of France (b. 1847)
 Dimitar Petkov, 14th Prime Minister of Bulgaria (assassinated) (b. 1847)
 March 18 – Marcellin Berthelot, French chemist (b. 1827)
 March 19 
 Thomas Bailey Aldrich, American poet and novelist (b. 1836)
 Mariano Baptista , 23rd President of Bolivia (b. 1832)
 March 23 – Konstantin Pobedonostsev, Russian statesman (b. 1827)
 March 25 – Ernst von Bergmann, Baltic German surgeon (b. 1836)

April 
 April 6 – William Henry Drummond, Irish-Canadian poet (b. 1854)
 April 14 – Frank Manly Thorn, American lawyer, politician, government official, essayist, journalist, humorist, inventor, and 6th Superintendent of the United States Coast and Geodetic Survey (b. 1836)
 April 23 – Alferd Packer, American cannibal (b. 1842)

May 
 May 1 – Melissa Elizabeth Riddle Banta, American poet (b. 1834)
 May 4 – John Watts de Peyster, American author, philanthropist, and soldier (b. 1821)
 May 6 – Emanuele Luigi Galizia, Maltese architect, civil engineer (b. 1830)
 May 12 – Joris-Karl Huysmans, French author (b. 1848)
 May 19 – Sir Benjamin Baker, English civil engineer (b. 1840)
 May 26 – Ida Saxton McKinley, First Lady of the United States (b. 1847)
 May 27 – Kevork Chavush, Armenian national hero (b. 1870)

June 
 June 4 – Agathe Backer-Grøndahl, Norwegian pianist and composer (b. 1847)
 June 6 – J. A. Chatwin, English architect (b. 1830)
 June 14 
 Bartolomé Masó, Cuban patriot (b. 1830)
 William Le Baron Jenney, American architect, engineer (b. 1832)
 June 23 – Hod Stuart, Canadian professional ice hockey player, killed in diving accident (b. 1879)
 June 25 – Sir John Hall, 12th Prime Minister of New Zealand (b. 1824)
 June 29 – Maximilian Cercha, Polish painter and drawer (b. 1818)

July 

 July 13 – Heinrich Kreutz, German astronomer (b. 1854)
 July 14 – Sir William Perkin, English chemist (b. 1838)
July 15 - Qin Jin, Chinese poet, revolutionary (b. 1875)
 July 28 – Mildred Amanda Baker Bonham, American travel writer (b. 1840)

August 
 August – Dinqinesh Mercha, empress consort of Ethiopia (b. 1815)
 August 1 
 Lucy Mabel Hall-Brown, American physician and writer (b. 1843)
 Ernesto Hintze Ribeiro, 3-time Prime Minister of Portugal (b. 1849)
 August 3 – Augustus Saint-Gaudens, Irish-American Beaux-Arts sculptor (b. 1848)
 August 4 – Richard Meade, Lord Gilford, British admiral (b. 1832)
 August 13 – Hermann Carl Vogel, German astrophysicist (b. 1841)
 August 15 – Joseph Joachim, Austrian violinist (b. 1831)
 August 25
Mary Elizabeth Coleridge, British poet, novelist (b. 1861)
 Alexandre Franquet, French admiral (b. 1828)
 August 30 – Richard Mansfield, Anglo-American actor (b. 1857)

September 
 September 4 – Edvard Grieg, Norwegian composer (b. 1843)
 September 6 – Sully Prudhomme, French writer, Nobel Prize laureate (b. 1839)
 September 9 – Ernest Roland Wilberforce, English bishop (b. 1840)
 September 12 – Ilia Chavchavadze, Georgian writer, Orthodox priest and saint (b. 1837)
 September 19 – Jacob Morenga, Namibian rebel leader (b. 1875)
 September 22 – Wilbur Olin Atwater, American chemist (b. 1844)
 September 30 – Sir John Ardagh, British army general (b. 1840)

October 
 October 10 – Adolf Furtwängler, German archaeologist, historian (b. 1853)
 October 30 – Caroline Dana Howe, American author (b. 1824)

November 
 November 1 – Alfred Jarry, French writer (b. 1873)
 November 6 – Sir James Hector, Scottish geologist (b. 1834)
 November 14 – Andrew Inglis Clark, Australian jurist and politician (b. 1848)
 November 15 – Raphael Kalinowski, Polish Discalced Carmelite friar and saint (b. 1835)
 November 16 – Robert I, Duke of Parma, last ruling Duke of Parma (b. 1848)
 November 17 – Sir Francis McClintock, Irish explorer and admiral in British Royal Navy (b. 1819)
 November 20 – Paula Modersohn-Becker, German painter (b. 1876)
 November 22 – Asaph Hall, American astronomer (b. 1829)
 November 23 – Naimuddin, Bengali writer and Islamic scholar (b. 1832)
 November 25 – Ludvig Mylius-Erichsen, Danish explorer (b. 1872)
 November 28 – Stanisław Wyspiański, Polish writer, painter and architect (b. 1869)
 November 30 – Ludwig Levy, German architect (b. 1854)

December 
 December 4 – Luis Sáenz Peña, 12th President of Argentina (b. 1822)
 December 8 – King Oscar II of Sweden (b. 1829)
 December 15 – Carola of Vasa, queen consort of Saxony (b. 1833)
 December 17 – William Thomson, 1st Baron Kelvin, Irish-born physicist and engineer (b. 1824)
 December 20 – Helen Louisa Bostwick Bird, American author (b. 1826)
 December 21 – Klara Hitler, Austrian mother of Adolf Hitler (b. 1860)
 December 23 – Pierre Janssen, French astronomer (b. 1824)
 December 28 – Kate Stone, American diarist (b. 1841)
 December 31 – Jules de Trooz, 18th Prime Minister of Belgium (b. 1857)

Date unknown 
 Ellen Russell Emerson, American ethnologist (b. 1837)
 Sarah Gibson Humphreys, American author and suffragist (b. 1830)
 Joseph Stannah, Founder of Stannah Lifts (b. 1836)

Nobel Prizes 

 Physics – Albert Abraham Michelson
 Chemistry – Eduard Buchner
 Medicine – Charles Louis Alphonse Laveran
 Literature – Rudyard Kipling
 Peace – Ernesto Teodoro Moneta, Louis Renault

References

Further reading
 Gilbert, Martin. A History of the Twentieth Century: Volume 1 1900-1933 (1997); global coverage of politics, diplomacy and warfare; pp 143–57.
 International Year Book: 1907 (1908) 1002pp, worldwide coverage online edition